The Roman Catholic Diocese of Yongping/Lulong is a Latin diocese in the Ecclesiastical province of Beijing in PR China, without canonically mandated Ordinary since decades.

Its episcopal see is Immaculate Conception Cathedral, located in the city of Yongping (now Lulong, Tangshan 唐山, Hebei)

History 
 Established on December 23, 1899 as Apostolic Vicariate of Eastern Chi-Li 直隸東, on territory split off from the Apostolic Vicariate of Northern Chi-Li 直隸北境 (now Peking archdiocese)
 Renamed on December 3, 1924 as Apostolic Vicariate of Yongpingfu 永平府
 Promoted and renamed (exclusively after its see) on April 11, 1946 as Diocese of Yongping 永平

Ordinaries 
(all Roman Rite, so far missionary members of a Latin congregation)

Apostolic Vicar of Eastern Chi-Li 直隸東 
 Ernest François Geurts, Congregation of the Mission (C.M.) (December 14, 1899 – December 3, 1924 see below), Titular Bishop of Rhinocorura (1899.12.14 – death 1940.07.21)

Apostolic Vicars of Yongpingfu 永平府 
 Ernest François Geurts, C.M. (see above December 3, 1924 – July 21, 1940)
 Eugenio Lebouille, C.M. (July 21, 1940 – April 11, 1946), Titular Bishop of Conana (1928.07.16 – death 1946.04.11), succeeding as former Coadjutor Vicar Apostolic of Yongpingfu 永平府 (1928.07.16 – 1940.07.21)

Suffragan Bishops of Yongping 永平 
 Eugenio Lebouille, C.M. (see above April 11, 1946 – March 6, 1948), emeritate as Titular Bishop of Calama (1948.03.06 – death 1957.05.27)
Apostolic Administrator Fr. John Herrijgers, C.M. (June 4, 1948 – ?)uncanonical: Lan Bo-lu (蘭柏露) (1958 – death 1976.07.28, no papal mandate)uncanonical: Paul Liu Jing-he (劉景和) (1981 – 2010.11, no papal mandate)uncanonical: Peter Fang Jian-ping (方建平) (2010 - ...), succeeding as former uncanonical Coadjutor Bishop of Yongping 永平 (China) (2000 – 2010.11, no papal mandate)''

Sources and external links

 GCatholic.org, with incumbent biography links
 Catholic Hierarchy

Roman Catholic dioceses in China
Religious organizations established in 1899
Roman Catholic dioceses and prelatures established in the 19th century
Christianity in Hebei
Lulong County